is a 1954 black and white Japanese film directed by Eisuke Takizawa.

Cast 
 Ryutaro Tatsumi as Chūji

See also 
 Kunisada Chūji (国定 忠治) (1810–1851)
 Kunisada Chuji (1958 film)
 The Gambling Samurai 1960 film

References

External links 
 

1954 films
Films directed by Eisuke Takizawa
Nikkatsu films
Japanese black-and-white films
1950s Japanese films